Kosovo participated at the 2018 Summer Youth Olympics in Buenos Aires, Argentina from 6 October to 18 October 2018. This was the country's Youth Olympic Games debut.

Medals

Medals awarded to participants of mixed-NOC (combined) teams are represented in italics. These medals are not counted towards the individual NOC medal tally.

Competitors

Athletics

The athlete Muhamet Ramadani was included in the shot thanks to an initiative by the European Athletics Association.

Boxing

Kosovo received an invitation of the International Olympic Committee to participate in the boxing tournament.

 Boys' 64 kg - Erdonis Maliqi
Boys

Judo

Kosovo qualified one athlete, based on their performance at the U18 European Championship.

 Girls' 44 kg - Erza Muminovic

Individual

Team

Swimming

Kosovo received an invitation of the IOC to participate in the swimming competitions.

 Girls' 100 m Breaststroke - Melisa Zhdrella

Weightlifting

Kosovo was given a quota by the tripartite committee to compete in weightlifting.

 Boys' events - Bleron Fetaovski

See also
Kosovo at the Youth Olympics

References

2018 in Kosovan sport
Nations at the 2018 Summer Youth Olympics
Kosovo at the Youth Olympics